Ottone in villa (Otho at his villa, RV 729) is an opera in three acts by Antonio Vivaldi to an Italian libretto by Domenico Lalli (the pseudonym of Sebastiano Biancardi). Lalli's pastoral drama is set in ancient Rome and was a condensed adaptation of Francesco Maria Piccioli's satirical libretto for Carlo Pallavicino's opera Messalina (1679). However, Lalli changed several of the characters in Piccioli's libretto. Messalina became an invented character, Cleonilla. Emperor Claudius became another Roman emperor, Otho (Ottone), who had already appeared as a protagonist in Monteverdi's L'incoronazione di Poppea (1642) and in Handel's Agrippina (1709).

Roles

Synopsis
The Roman Emperor Ottone is in love with Cleonilla, who can't resist flirting with two young Romans, Ostilio and Caio. Ostilio is in reality a woman, Tullia, who disguised herself because she's in love with Caio. She plans to kill Cleonilla out of jealousy, but she first tries to dissuade her from her relation with Caio. Caio sees the meeting and misinterprets it as a romantic encounter. He warns Ottone, who commands him to kill Ostilio. Before he can execute the order, Ostilio reveals himself to be Tullia. Cleonilla claims to have always known it, to conciliate Ottone. He believes her and the opera closes with the marriage of Tullia and Caio.

Recordings
Vivaldi: Ottone in Villa – Patrizia Pace (Cleonilla, soprano), Anna Maria Ferrante (Tullia, soprano), Aris Christofellis (Caio, male soprano), Jean Nirouët (Ottone, countertenor), Luigi Petroni (Decio, tenor); Ensemble Seicentonovecento;  (conductor). Recorded September 1993. Label: Bongiovanni 10016/18.
Vivaldi: Ottone in Villa – Susan Gritton (Cleonilla, soprano), Monica Groop (Ottone, mezzosoprano), Nancy Argenta (Caio Silio, soprano), Mark Padmore (Decio, tenor), Sophie Daneman (Tullia, soprano); Collegium Musicum 90; Richard Hickox (conductor). Performing Edition (1997) by Eric Cross. Label: Chandos Chaconne 0614.
Vivaldi: Ottone in Villa – Maria Laura Martorana (Cleonilla, soprano), Tuva Semmingsen (Ottone, mezzosoprano), Florin Cezar Ouatu (Caio Silio, countertenor), Luca Dordolo (Decio, tenor), Marina Bartoli (Tullia, soprano); L'Arte dell'Arco; Federico Guglielmo (conductor). Performing edition by Federico Guglielmo (2008 revision) from the manuscript by Vittorio Bolcato. Label: Brilliant Classics 94105.
Vivaldi: Ottone in Villa – Veronica Cangemi (Cleonilla, soprano), Roberta Invernizzi (Tullia, soprano), Julia Lezhneva (Caio, soprano), Sonia Prina (Ottone, contralto), Topi Lehtipuu (Decio, tenor); Il Giardino Armonico; Giovanni Antonini (conductor). Performing edition by Eric Cross. Label: Naïve B004215TO0. (2010)

References

Sources

External links

Operas
Italian-language operas
Operas by Antonio Vivaldi
1713 operas
Operas set in the 1st century
Operas set in ancient Rome
Music dedicated to nobility or royalty
Cultural depictions of Otho